Boris Derichebourg is a former racing driver and current President of Derichebourg Multiservices, born on March 16, 1978, in Enghien-les-Bains (Val-d'Oise).

Career 
Boris Derichebourg began his career as a car driver and competed in his first karting competitions at the age of 12. Runner-up in French karting in 1994, he then went on to Formula 3 (1 podium, 1 pole in 1996) and then to Formula 3000 where he collected the podiums of the Spa and Barcelona Grands Prix in 1998. In 2000, he continued his career in GT and was the runner-up team world champion at the Petit Le Mans. Between 2000 and 2003, he participated three times in the 24 Hours of Le Mans.

In 2004, Boris Derichebourg left automobile competition and joined the Derichebourg Group, where he held various positions within the Environment subsidiaries between 2004 and 2006.

In 2006, the Derichebourg Group acquired Penauille Polyservices which became Derichebourg Multiservices. Boris Derichebourg then became the Director General and finally the President in 2008.

Based on his strong experience with high-level sports, Boris Derichebourg capitalized on his competitive faculties to develop a different entrepreneurial approach. He restructured the company and gave it a new life by developing new supporting sectors.

He travels the world in search of new models and services that will allow him to extend activities in France and internationally. Boris Derichebourg also attaches great respect to a large diversity within his teams and considers that differences represent a major force in the current company. As such Derichebourg Multiservices includes 112 nationalities and a number of employees with disabilities above the regulation.

In the space of a decade, Derichebourg Multiservices has become the benchmark player for outsourced services by proposing solutions to industry (aeronautics, nuclear, automobile, etc.), the service sector (Facility Management), urban space, and also by intervening as an expert in sourcing through its temporary work activities.

Continuing its development, the company today is present in 10 countries.

In sustained growth, Derichebourg Multiservices generated an Annual Revenue in 2019 of 858 million euros for a workforce of 32,200 employees.

References 

1978 births
French racing drivers
24 Hours of Le Mans drivers
Living people
Pescarolo Sport drivers
Super Nova Racing drivers
International Formula 3000 drivers
Team Astromega drivers
Graff Racing drivers